Dover Township may refer to places in the U.S. state of Michigan:

 Dover Township, Lake County, Michigan
 Dover Township, Lenawee County, Michigan
 Dover Township, Otsego County, Michigan

See also 
 Dover, Michigan (disambiguation)
 Dover Township (disambiguation)

Michigan township disambiguation pages